James Lowry Jr. (1820 – July 20, 1876) was an American politician and Mayor of Pittsburgh from 1864 to 1866.

Life
Lowry was born in Scotland in 1820. He owned a foundry and was also a Coal merchant. The city's industries were all booming during Mayor Lowry's term. He would eventually be elected Coroner of Allegheny County.

Lowry died in St. Louis. He is buried in Allegheny Cemetery.

See also

List of mayors of Pittsburgh

Sources
James Lowry Jr. at Political Graveyard

1820 births
1876 deaths
Mayors of Pittsburgh
Scottish emigrants to the United States
Burials at Allegheny Cemetery
19th-century American politicians